Alexeevca is a village in Edineț District, Moldova.

References

Villages of Edineț District